{{DISPLAYTITLE:C22H35NO2}}
The molecular formula C22H35NO2 (molar mass: 345.52 g/mol, exact mass: 345.2668 u) may refer to:

 Himbacine
 LY-255582

Molecular formulas